Giovanni Antonio Hofman (12 June 1834 – 26 October 1917) was a Dutch Catholic missionary prelate and bishop of the Roman Catholic Diocese of Lu'an from 1891 to 1901.

Biography
Giovanni Antonio Hofman was born in Voerden, North Holland, United Kingdom of the Netherlands, on 12 June 1834. He joined the Franciscans on 4 October 1855. He was ordained a priest on 29 August 1858. In 1884, he was sent to the Qing Empire to preach, first in Hubei and then transferred to Shanxi. On 24 April 1891, he succeeded Martin Poell as bishop of the Roman Catholic Diocese of Lu'an. In the Boxer Rebellion in 1900, he fled to Lin County (now Linzhou), Henan, and returned to the Netherlands on 16 July 1901.

Giovanni Antonio Hofman died in Wychen on 26 October 1917, at the age of 83.

References

1834 births
1917 deaths
Dutch Roman Catholic missionaries
Dutch Roman Catholic bishops
Chinese Roman Catholic bishops